David William Wright (August 27, 1875 in Dennison, Ohio – January 18, 1946 in Dennison, Ohio) was a professional baseball pitcher. He appeared in two games in Major League Baseball, one for the Pittsburgh Pirates in 1895 and one for the Chicago Colts in 1897.

Sources

Major League Baseball pitchers
Pittsburgh Pirates players
Chicago Colts players
New Castle (minor league baseball) players
Twin Cities Hustlers players
Columbus Buckeyes (minor league) players
Columbus Senators players
Minneapolis Millers (baseball) players
Baseball players from Ohio
19th-century baseball players
People from Dennison, Ohio
1875 births
1946 deaths